Series 3 of The Great Irish Bake Off aired on TV3 in Ireland and saw twelve home bakers take part in a bake-off to test every aspect of their baking skills as they battled to be crowned The Great Irish Bake Off's best amateur baker. Each week saw keen bakers put through two challenges in a particular discipline. The series aired from 25 October 2015 till 13 December 2015. This season was presented by Anna Nolan and judged by Paul Kelly and Lilly Higgins.

The Bakers

Results Summary

Ailish left the show in episode 2 due to illness.

Colour key:

Episodes

Episode 1: Desserts

Episode 2: Cakes

NOTE: Ailish felt ill during the Technical and didn't finish the challenge. Before the Showstopper, Anna announced that she would not be continuing in the competition. No one was eliminated after the Showstopper.

Episode 3: Bread

Episode 4: Chocolate

Episode 5: International Week

Episode 6: Party Week

Episode 7: Semi-Final

Episode 8: Final

Christmas Special 2015
A special edition of the show for Christmas in which four celebrities bid for the title of Star Baker in the face of a seasonal challenge set by Paul Kelly and Lilly Higgins.
It aired on December 20, 2015.

References

2015 Irish television seasons
2